West Sister Island is an island of the U.S. state of Ohio located in the Western Basin of Lake Erie. The  island, jointly owned by the United States Coast Guard and the U.S. Fish and Wildlife Service, is Ohio's only designated Wilderness Area, the West Sister Island National Wildlife Refuge.

Most of the island is covered with trees. Tall hackberry trees make up most of the canopy, with poison ivy on the ground. Polygonatum and a great variety of ferns, wildflowers, mushrooms, and other plant life can also be found.

The island is part of the Pelee Archipelago which also includes East Sister Island and Middle Sister Island (both in Ontario, Canada).  West Sister Island is roughly 13 miles west of Rattlesnake Island, 14.5 miles east of Turtle Island, and 8.75 miles due north of the Ohio  mainland.

Lighthouse
A lighthouse was established on the westernmost point of West Sister Island in 1848 to mark the west end of the South Passage through Lake Erie's Bass Islands. The West Sister Island Lighthouse is still an active aid to navigation, and is one of the oldest lighthouses to survive on the Great Lakes.

History

Ironically, after being established as a wildlife refuge in 1937, the island was used by the United States Army for artillery practice during World War II. Although the wildlife population and the lighthouse were not significantly damaged, the keeper's house was destroyed. It is also reported that fuel tanks jettisoned by dive bombers can still be found on the island.

West Sister Island was a popular stop for bootleggers during Prohibition. The island provided a certain level of visual cover from the authorities for rum runners crossing the lake. When approached by these authorities, bootleggers would often dump their illegal stash overboard. Legend has it that bottles of prohibition-era alcohol can still be found on the bottom of the lake around the island.

West Sister Island was once rumored to be the final resting place of missing Teamsters boss Jimmy Hoffa. It was speculated that after his abduction in Detroit, he was brought by boat to the island and buried. The island's jungle-like environment would have made discovery of his remains difficult; however these conditions would also have made the deposit of his remains difficult, therefore the island is not one of the more widely considered possibilities in the case.

Wildlife Refuge

The West Sister Island National Wildlife Refuge was established in 1937 by President Franklin D. Roosevelt  "as a refuge and breeding ground for migratory birds and other wildlife...," specifically designated to protect the largest wading bird nesting colony on the U.S. Great Lakes. The refuge is managed by the staff of the Ottawa National Wildlife Refuge as a wilderness area, as provided under the Federal Wilderness Act. To protect it, public access is permitted for research only.

The refuge, which has a surface area of 80.13 acres (0.3243 km² or 32.43 ha), was recognized in 2000 as part of a globally Important Bird Area.

West Sister Island provides nesting habitat for 40% of all the nesting herons and egrets in the U.S. Great Lakes.

In popular culture
The wildlife refuge was featured in a 2007 episode of the Discovery Channel TV series Dirty Jobs with Mike Rowe. Due to the large number of birds vomiting and defecating from high in the trees the island is referred to as "Vomit Island" in the program.

In the animated television series Transformers Animated, the Dinobots reside in refuge on an island called "North Sister Island", located in Lake Erie, a fictional reference to West Sister Island.

References

Notes

Further reading
 Oleszewski, Wes. Great Lakes Lighthouses, American and Canadian: A Comprehensive Directory/Guide to Great Lakes Lighthouses, (Gwinn, Michigan: Avery Color Studios, Inc., 1998) .
 U.S. Coast Guard. Historically Famous Lighthouses (Washington, D.C.: Government Printing Office, 1957).
 Wright, Larry and Wright, Patricia. Great Lakes Lighthouses Encyclopedia Hardback (Erin: Boston Mills Press, 2006)

External links

 West Sister Island Light.
Refuge website
Wobser, David; Hart, Al.  West Sister Island Lighthouse at boatnerd.com.

Protected areas of Lucas County, Ohio
National Wildlife Refuges in Ohio
Protected areas established in 1937
Islands of Lake Erie in Ohio
Landforms of Lucas County, Ohio
1937 establishments in Ohio